The following list of Connecticut companies includes notable companies that are, or once were, headquartered in Connecticut.

Companies based in Connecticut

A
 Aetna
 Affinion Group
 Aircastle
 Amphenol
 ATMI
 AQR Capital

B
 Barden Corporation
 Bevin Brothers Manufacturing Company
 Bigelow Tea Company
 BlueTriton Brands
 Bob's Discount Furniture
 Boehringer Ingelheim USA
 Branson Ultrasonics
 Breitling USA
 Bridgewater Associates
 Bristol Technology

C
 Cadenza Innovation
 Cannondale Bicycle Corporation
 Cartus
 Charter Arms
 Charter Communications
 Cigna
 Colt Defense
 Colt's Manufacturing Company
 Conair Corporation
 Crane Co.

D
 Datto
 Diageo
 Digital Currency Group
 Dooney & Bourke
 Duracell

E
 Emcor
 ESL Investments
 ESPN
 Ethan Allen
 Eversource Energy

F
 FactSet
 Fairfield County Bank
 Farrel Corporation
 Fire-Lite Alarms
 First County Bank
 Foxwoods Resort Casino
 Frontier Communications
 Frontier Communications of Connecticut
 FuelCell Energy

G
 Gartner
 General Dynamics Electric Boat
 GE Capital
 Gerber Scientific
 Gramercy Funds Management
 Guideposts

H
 H/2 Capital Partners
 The Hartford
 Hartford Courant
 Henkel North American Consumer Goods
 High Precision
 Hitachi Capital America Corp.
 Hosmer Mountain Soda

I
 IMS Health
 Interactive Brokers
 IQVIA
 ITT Inc.

J
 J.H. Whitney & Company

K
 Kayak.com
 Knights of Columbus

L
 Lego USA
 Lone Pine Capital
 LoveSac
 Liberty Bank

M
 Media Storm
 Metropolitan District of Connecticut

N
 Nestlé Waters North America
 New Britain Dry Cleaning Corporation
 Newman's Own
 Newtown Savings Bank
 North Sails
 North Street Capital, LP

O
 Otis Elevator Company

P
 People's United Financial
 Pepperidge Farm
 Philip Morris International
 Photronics Inc
 Pirate Capital
 Pitney Bowes
 Playtex
 Point72 Asset Management
 Pratt & Whitney
 Praxair
 Priceline.com
 Primacy
 Purdue Pharma

R
 Reliant Air
 Rhone Apparel

S
 S.A.C. Capital Advisors
 Saffron Road
 Savings Bank of Danbury
 Sikorsky Aircraft
 Sikorsky Credit Union
 Silver Point Capital
 SNET America
 Spectrum (TV service)
 Sperry Rail Service
 Stanley Black & Decker
 Stew Leonard's
 Sturm, Ruger & Co.
 Subway
 Synchrony Financial

T
 Taunton Press
 Ted's Restaurant
 Terex
 Tetley USA Inc.
 Timex Group USA
 Tower Optical
 Trufresh

U 
 UBS
 Union Savings Bank
 United Rentals
 United States Rubber Company
 United Technologies
 Urstadt Biddle Properties

V
 Ventus (wireless company)
 Vertrue
 Victorinox North America
 Viking Global Investors
 Vineyard Vines
 Virtus Investment Partners

W
 W. R. Berkley Corporation
 Webster Bank
 Western Connecticut Health Network
 WorldQuant
 WWE

X
 Xerox
 XPO Logistics

Companies formerly based in Connecticut

0-9
 454 Life Sciences

A
 A. C. Gilbert Company
 Ansonia Clock Company
 Applera
 Arrowhead Water

B
 Bear Naked, Inc.
 Blue Sky Studios
 Bon Ami
 Borden
 Bridgeport Machines, Inc. 
 Brooks Brothers

C
 Caldor
 Carrier Corporation
 Cervalis
 Chemtura
 Clairol
 Coleco
 Connecticut Company
 Crabtree & Evelyn

D
 The Daily Voice

E
 Edible Arrangements

F
 Fairfield Greenwich Group
 Frisbie Pie Company
 FrontPoint Partners

G
 G. Fox & Co.
 General Electric

H
 Hamilton Sundstrand
 Harney & Sons
 Hartford Whalers

I
 International Paper
 Ives Manufacturing Company

J
 JWM Partners

L
 Long-Term Capital Management

M
 Marlin Firearms
 Meriden Firearms Co.
 MicroWarehouse

N
 New York, New Haven and Hartford Railroad
 NewAlliance Bank

P
 PerkinElmer
 Peter Paul Candy Manufacturing Company
 Pequot Capital Management
 Plainfield Asset Management
 Pope Manufacturing Company
 Praxair
 Price Rite

R
 Remington Arms
 Russell Trust Association

S
 Schick
 Sharps Rifle Manufacturing Company
 Southern Air
 Swisher International Group

T
 Time Warner Cable
 Tobin Arms
 Towers Perrin
 The Travelers Companies

U
 U.S. Smokeless Tobacco Company
 United Natural Foods
 UPS

W
 Weekly Reader
 Winchester Repeating Arms Company

References

Connecticut